Small Faces were an English British beat band formed in 1965 by Steve Marriott, Ronnie Lane, Kenney Jones, and Jimmy Winston (who was soon replaced by Ian McLagan). Heavily influenced by American rhythm and blues, they later evolved into a psychedelic act before disbanding in 1969.

Despite the fact that they were together only four years, Small Faces' music output from the mid- to late sixties remains as notable as any British beat and psychedelic music of that era. AllMusic refers to them as "the best English band never to make it big in America". They received the Ivor Novello Outstanding Contribution to British Music "Lifetime Achievement" award in 1996.

Albums

Studio albums

Compilation albums

Live albums

EPs
 Hits Vol.5 (Decca EP DFE 8663) - 1966
Los Bravos "Black Is Black" / Alan Price Set "I Put A Spell On You" / The Animals "Don't Bring Me Down" / Small Faces "Hey Girl"
 Hits Vol.6 (Decca EP DFE 8667) - 1966
Lulu "Don't Answer Me" / Alan Price Set "Hi-Lilli Hi-Lo" / Small Faces "All or Nothing" / Jonathan King "Just Like a Woman"
 Hits Vol.7 (Decca EP DFE 8675) - 1967
The Bachelors "Walk With Faith In Your Heart" / Small Faces "My Mind's Eye" / Val Doonican "What Would I Be" / Ronnie Aldrich And His Two Pianos With The London Festival Orchestra "Somewhere My Love (Lara's Theme From "Dr. Zhivago")"
 Small Faces (New Zealand Decca EP) - 1966
"Sha-La-La-La-Lee" / "Whatcha Gonna Do About It" / "All or Nothing"
 Small Faces (France Decca EP) - 1967
"My Mind's Eye" / "I Can't Dance with You" / "Shake" / "One Night Stand"

Singles

Other singles and live sessions

7-inch Single (August 6, 1965)
 Whatcha Gonna Do About It
 What's A Matter Baby

(Early Session – Mid 1965)
 What’cha Gonna Do About It (Alternate Version)

BBC Session (Saturday Club – 23/08/65)
 Steve Marriott Interview
 What'cha Gonna Do About It
 Jump Back
 Baby Don't You Do It

7-inch Single (November 1965)
 I’ve Got Mine
 It's Too Late

7-inch Single (January 28, 1966)
 Sha-La-La-La-Lee
 Grow Your Own

BBC Session (Saturday Club – 14/03/66)
 Shake
 Steve Marriott Interview
 Sha-La-La-La-Lee
 You Need Loving

BBC Session (Saturday Club – 03/05/66)
 Steve Marriott Interview
 Hey Girl
 E Too D
 One Night Stand

7-inch Single (May 8, 1966)
 Hey Girl
 Almost Grown

"Small Faces" (May 8, 1966)
(1st Album Sessions – Early 1966)
 Shake
 Come On Children
 You Better Believe It
 One Night Stand
 Sorry She's Mine
 Own Up Time
 You Need Loving
 Don't Stop What You're Doing
 E Too D
 Hey Girl (Alternate Version)
 Own Up Time (Extended Version)
 Shake (Alternate Version)
 Come On Children (Alternate Version)
 E Too D (Alternate Version)

(Early 2nd Album Sessions – Mid 1966)
 (Tell Me) Have You Ever Seen Me (Early Version)
 My Mind's Eye (Alternate Version)
 Baby Don't You Do It (Different Version)

7-inch Single (August 5, 1966)
 All or Nothing
 Understanding

BBC Session (Saturday Club – 30/08/66)
 You Better Believe It
 Understanding
 Steve Marriott Interview
 All or Nothing

7-inch Single (November 11, 1966)
 My Mind's Eye
 I Can't Dance with You

"From the Beginning" (Released 1967)
(Later 2nd Album Sessions – Mid to Late 1966)
 Runaway
 Yesterday, Today And Tomorrow
 That Man
 My Way of Giving
 Take This Hurt Off Me
 Baby Don't You Do It
 Plum Nellie
 You've Really Got a Hold on Me
 Take This Hurt Off Me (Different Version)

7-inch Single (March 3, 1967)
 I Can't Make It
 Just Passing

(Early 3rd Album Sessions – Early to Mid 1967)
 (Tell Me) Have You Ever Seen Me (Alternate Version)

7-inch Single (May 26, 1967)
 Patterns
 E Too D (1966)

7-inch Single (June 2, 1967)
 Here Come the Nice
 Talk To You

“Small Faces” (June 1967)
(Later 3rd Album Sessions – Mid 1967)
 (Tell Me) Have You Ever Seen Me
 Something I Want to Tell You
 Feeling Lonely
 Happy Boys Together
 Get Yourself Together
 Things Are Going to Get Better
 Green Circles
 Become Like You
 All Our Yesterdays
 Show Me the Way
 Up the Wooden Hills to Bedfordshire
 Eddie's Dreaming

7-inch Single (Aug. 4th 1967)
 Itchycoo Park
 I'm Only Dreaming

7-inch Single (Dec. 2nd 1967)
 Tin Soldier
 I Feel Much Better

BBC Session (Top Gear – 14/04/68)
 If I Were a Carpenter*
 Kenney Jones Interview
 Lazy Sunday
 Every Little Bit Hurts (with PP Arnold)

"Ogden's Nut Gone Flake" (June 1968) 
(4th Album Sessions – November–December 1967)
 Ogden's Nut Gone Flake
 Afterglow of Your Love
 Long Agos and Worlds Apart
 Rene
 Song of a Baker
 Lazy Sunday
 Happiness Stan
 Rollin' Over
 The Hungry Intruder
 The Journey
 Mad John
 Happy Days Toy Town

(Mid-1968 Sessions)
 Me, You and Us Too
 (If You Think You're) Groovy (with PP Arnold)Recorded: October 1967.

7-inch Single (June 28, 1968)
 The Universal
 Donkey Rides, a Penny, a Glass

7-inch Single (Late 1968)
 Afterglow of Your Love
 Wham Bam Thank You Man

(The Final Sessions – Late 1968)
 The Autumn Stone
 Collibosher
 Red Balloon
 Call It Something Nice
 Wide Eyed Girl On the Wall
 Mind The Doors Please (Recorded February 1967)
 Don't Burst My Bubble (Recorded February 1968)
 Every Little Bit Hurts
 Picaninny (Recorded February 1968)
 Take My Time (Recorded February 1967)
 The Pig Trotters (Instrumental)
 The War of the Worlds
 Red Balloon (Alternate Mix)
 Wham Bam Thank You Man (Alternate Mix)

The Final Tour – Late 1968
 All or Nothing (Live)
 Every Little Bit Hurts (Live)
 If I Were a Carpenter (Live)
 Rollin' Over (Live)
 Tin Soldier (Live)

U.S. 7-inch Single (Early 1969)
 Mad John (Single Version)
 The Journey

Notes

References

External links

Discography
Small Faces, The